Acadie is a provincial electoral district in Quebec, Canada, that elects members to the National Assembly of Quebec.  It is located in northern Montreal and consists of parts of the Saint-Laurent and Ahuntsic-Cartierville boroughs.

It was created as L'Acadie for the 1973 election from parts of Ahuntsic and Saint-Laurent electoral districts.  It changed to its present name in 1989.

In the change from the 2001 to the 2011 electoral map, its territory was unchanged.

Members of the National Assembly

Election results

* Result compared to Action démocratique

References

External links
Information
 Elections Quebec

Election results
 Election results as "Acadie" (National Assembly)
 Election results as "L'Acadie" (National Assembly)
 Election results (QuébecPolitique)

Maps
 2011 map (PDF)
 2001 map (Flash)
2001–2011 changes (Flash)
1992–2001 changes (Flash)
 Electoral map of Montréal region
 Quebec electoral map, 2011

Provincial electoral districts of Montreal
Quebec provincial electoral districts
Saint-Laurent, Quebec
Ahuntsic-Cartierville